Killings is a surname. Notable people with the surname include:

Cedric Killings (born 1977), American football player
Debra Killings (born 1966), American singer and bass guitarist
D. J. Killings (born 1995), American football player
Ron Killings (born 1972), American professional wrestler, actor and rapper

See also
Killing (surname)